Shuford Stadium is a 4,500-capacity stadium located in Salisbury, North Carolina. It is home to Catawba College, who play in the South Atlantic Conference.

The stadium was built in 1925 but has been upgraded several times since. The field is named for former coach Gordon Kirkland, and the athletics track is named for Charlotte area philanthropist Irwin Belk.

References

External links
 Shuford Stadium

College football venues
College track and field venues in the United States
Catawba Indians football
American football venues in North Carolina
Athletics (track and field) venues in North Carolina
Sports venues in Rowan County, North Carolina
Buildings and structures in Salisbury, North Carolina
1925 establishments in North Carolina
Sports venues completed in 1925